Dishman Hills Natural Resources Conservation Area is a  area protected by a combination of public and non-profit groups (Spokane County Parks and Recreation Department, Washington Department of Natural Resources, Inland Northwest Land Conservancy, and Dishman Hills Conservancy), located in Spokane County, Washington. The granite outcroppings, forming the bulk of the area, were originally formed 70 million years ago, by volcanic magma pushing up through the Earth's crust and then cooling. The protected Dishman Hills Natural Resources Conservation Area with its rugged, potholed appearance and deep gullies is a result of the Missoula Floods and represents one of the most ecologically diverse regions in Washington state, where forests, grasslands and shrublands converge and is within two ecoregions, the Okanagan and Northern Rockies ecoregions. The hills consist of small ravines, ponds, and large chunks of granite, that support an eco-system consisting mainly of ponderosa pine, as well as about 300 different flowering plants (including Indian Camas), and 73 different species of mushrooms. The area also supports wildlife, such as coyotes, marmots, white-tailed deer, pheasants, and dozens of species of butterflies. The Dishman Hills rise immediately south of the Dishman section of The City of Spokane Valley. Continuing south, out of the park, the elevation continues to rise to the Rocks of Sharon and the Iller Creek Conservation Area near the peak of Krell Hill.

Valley View Fire

On Thursday, July 10, 2008 at about 3:30 PM local time, the Valley View Fire started in the Dishman Hills area. As of Friday morning it burned  and destroyed 11 homes. Washington State Governor Chris Gregoire declared a state of emergency for Spokane County. A mandatory evacuation was ordered in the area and two shelters were set up around Spokane Valley.

The fire's origin was a smoldering fire made by a resident of South Eastern Lane. The smoldering fire had been started days before the Dishman Hills Fire, and was left unattended inside of an old tree stump before it was re-ignited by fierce winds on the afternoon of Thursday, July 11. These same winds spread the fire quickly across the Dishman Hills and threatened hundreds of homes along Dishman-Mica Road. Many homes in the Park Drive area, located between the fire's origin and the Dishman Hills Natural Area, were in the direct path of the fire.

Among other things, some factors in the spread of the fire were the unprecedented wind speeds, and the amount of natural fuel in the Dishman Hills area.

References

External links

Parks in Washington (state)
Parks in Spokane County, Washington
Hiking trails in Washington (state)
Hills of Washington (state)
Protected areas of Spokane County, Washington
Washington Natural Areas Program
Landforms of Spokane County, Washington
Mountains of Spokane County, Washington
Mountains of Washington (state)
Selkirk Mountains